The City of Casey is a local government area in Victoria, Australia in the outer south-eastern suburbs of Melbourne. Casey is Victoria's most populous municipality, with a June 2018 population of 340,419.

The city is named after Lord Casey, the 16th Governor-General of Australia, and was formed in 1994 by the merger of most of the City of Berwick with parts of Shire of Cranbourne (including Cranbourne itself), and the Churchill Park Drive estate within the City of Knox.

Geography
Casey spreads from the base of the Dandenong Ranges in the north to the shoreline of Western Port in the south. It features a wide variety of geographical features, due to its outer metropolitan location.

The north, in the foothills of the Dandenongs, is primarily made up of large blocks of land used for grazing, with some small vineyards in operation. An Urban Growth Boundary has been in place since 2005 to protect this area from future residential subdivision.

South of Cranbourne is mainly farmland, used for market gardening and grazing. A small number of flower farms exist around Junction Village, along with a large chicken processing plant in Clyde.  This green area has now been opened up for housing development, in the areas of Cranbourne East, Clyde and Clyde North.

The southern boundary of the municipality is the Western Port shoreline including the fishing villages of Tooradin, Blind Bight, Warneet and Cannons Creek. Protected marine reserves exist along this coastline and extend into the Mornington Peninsula at Pearcedale.

The Cardinia border of the city is formed for some of the boundary by the Cardinia Creek, which is drained through channels into Western Port at its southern end. The popular Riding of the Bounds event takes place along this border, in recognition of Berwick's sister city status with Berwick-upon-Tweed in Northumberland, England.

City council
The City of Casey is divided into six wards. The wards are: Balla Balla, Edrington, Four Oaks, Mayfield, River Gum and Springfield.

Elections are held every four years with voters in Balla Balla Ward electing one councillor and all other wards electing two councillors per ward. The eleven councillors vote each year to elect a mayor.

In February 2020, the Victorian Minister for Local Government, Adem Somyurek, dismissed all Casey councillors following a report from municipal monitor Laurinda Gardner that found significant governance failures at the council. Somyurek then appointed Noelene Duff as interim administrator.

In May 2020 Somyurek appointed Noelene Duff PSM, Cameron Boardman and Miguel Belmar as Council administrator panel, to remain until October 2024.

Places of interest

Townships and localities
The 2021 census, the city had a population of 365,239 up from 299,301 in the 2016 census

^ - Territory divided with another LGA

Sport 
The Melbourne City Football Club is based in the City of Casey.

The Casey Demons (formerly Scorpions), an Australian rules football club represent Casey in the Victorian Football League. Their home ground is at the Casey Fields Complex in Cranbourne. The team was founded in around 1903 in Springvale. The club relocated to Casey Fields and later developed a relationship with the  Melbourne Football Club has developed a partnership with the City of Casey, with training sessions and other events held at Casey Fields.

The Casey-South Melbourne Cricket Club also have their home ground at Casey Fields.

The Casey Warriors play rugby league in NRL Victoria.

The Casey Cavaliers are the representative basketball club of the City of Casey. They compete in the NBL1, Big V and VJBL competitions. The Casey Basketball Association oversees all afiliated basketball within the City of Casey and has over 8,000 weekly participants.

Media 
Community Radio – 97.7 FM 3SER

Friendship and Sister City Relationships 
The City of Casey is twinned with

In 1998 the City of Casey established a friendship link (also known as a twin town) with  Ioannina, Greece, which lapsed in 2008.

See also
 List of places on the Victorian Heritage Register in the City of Casey
 Mornington Peninsula and Western Port Biosphere Reserve

Notes

References

External links
 
Official website
Metlink local public transport map
Link to Land Victoria interactive maps

Local government areas of Melbourne
Greater Melbourne (region)